A list of films produced in Hong Kong in 1987:.

1987

See also 
 1987 in Hong Kong

References

External links
 IMDB list of Hong Kong films of 1987
 Hong Kong films of 1987 at HKcinemamagic.com

1987
Lists of 1987 films by country or language
1987 in Hong Kong